Narsipalle is a village in the Uyyalawada Mandal of Kurnool district in Andhra Pradesh, India.

References 

Villages in Kurnool district